SNJ  may refer to:
Stroud News & Journal, an English newspaper
The LRT station abbreviation for Senja LRT station, Bukit Panjang, Singapore
The US Navy designation for the North American T-6 Texan training aircraft
The ICAO code for Skynet Asia Airways
Sango language, ISO 639-3 code
Switching noise jitter